Kallur is a small village in Thrissur district of Kerala, southwest India, which is almost 13 km from Thrissur City.

References

Villages in Thrissur district